Maurice Patrick Joseph Connell (9 March 1902 – 4 February 1975) was an Australian rules footballer who played with Carlton and South Melbourne in the Victorian Football League (VFL).

Notes

External links 

Maurie Connell's profile at Blueseum

1902 births
1975 deaths
Carlton Football Club players
Sydney Swans players
Australian rules footballers from Victoria (Australia)
University Blues Football Club players